The Sahrawi Arab Democratic Republic (SADR) was proclaimed by the Polisario Front on 27 February 1976, in Bir Lehlu, Western Sahara. SADR claims sovereignty over the entire territory of Western Sahara, a former Spanish colony; however, at present the SADR government controls only about 20–25% of the territory it claims. It calls the territories under its control the "Liberated Territories".

 out of a total of  United Nations member states. UN member states, but, of these,  have since "frozen" or "withdrawn" recognition. Several states that do not recognize the Sahrawi Republic nonetheless recognize the Polisario Front as the legitimate representative of the population of the Western Sahara, but not as the government-in-exile of a sovereign state.

The SADR has been a member of the African Union (AU), formerly the Organization of African Unity (OAU), since 1984. At the time, Morocco withdrew from the OAU in protest, until 2017, when Morocco again joined the African Union. The SADR also participates as guest on meetings of the Non-Aligned Movement or the New Asian–African Strategic Partnership, over Moroccan objections.

The Arab League simply supports "Moroccan territorial integrity", without further specification. In 2020, the United States under Donald Trump was the first country to recognize Morocco's unilateral annexation of Western Sahara. While some countries reiterate support for the "territorial integrity of Morocco", a number of countries have expressed their support for a future status of Western Sahara as an autonomous part of Morocco.

Besides Mexico, Algeria, Iran, Venezuela, Vietnam, Nigeria and South Africa, India was the major middle power to have ever recognized SADR, having allowed the Sahrawi Arab Democratic Republic to open an embassy in New Delhi in 1985. However, India withdrew its recognition in 2000.

Recognition by the International Court of Justice

On 16 October 1975, by the mean of an Advisory Opinion, the International Court of Justice (ICJ) declared that it did not find any territorial sovereignty tie, either from the Kingdom of Morocco or the Mauritanian entity, over the territory of Western Sahara. Moreover, the ICJ recognized the self-determination of the peoples of the territory of Western Sahara through their free and genuine expression of such will. The decision reads as follows:

States that have recognized the SADR

 UN member states and South Ossetia either currently recognize the SADR or have recognized it in the past. Of these,  have "suspended", "frozen" or "withdrawn" recognition (most recently Guyana). Several African countries and Caribbean or Pacific island-states have taken such actions subsequent to Moroccan lobbying and offers of economic and other exchanges, although the association of such decisions and these efforts is disputable. On the other hand, some states which had "withdrawn" or "frozen" recognition later resumed it (most recently Colombia and South Sudan).

The following lists all the states that have ever recognized the SADR.

States whose parliaments have voted to recognize SADR 
The parliaments of several states that do not recognize the Sahrawi Republic have called on their respective governments to recognize SADR. The parliament of Sweden was the first in the EU voted to recognize Western Sahara in December 2012, but this has not been enacted by the Swedish government. Declarations were also adopted by the parliaments of Chile and Brazil.

The following lists states whose parliaments have recognized the SADR.

See also
 Political status of Western Sahara
 Foreign relations of the Sahrawi Arab Democratic Republic
 List of states with limited recognition

Notes

References

External links
 Sahara Press Service – public service of the Sahrawi Arab Democratic Republic 

 
Diplomatic recognition